The 1975–76 Northern Premier League was the eighth season of the Northern Premier League, a regional football league in Northern England, the northern areas of the Midlands and North Wales. The season began on 16 August 1975 and concluded on 1 May 1976.

Overview
The League featured twenty-four teams.

Team changes
No clubs were promoted, conversely, none of the clubs were relegated.

League table

Results

Stadia and locations

Cup results

Challenge Cup

Northern Premier League Shield

Between Champions of NPL Premier Division and Winners of the NPL Cup.

FA Cup

Out of the twenty-four clubs from the Northern Premier League, only four teams reached for the second round:

Second Round

Third Round

FA Trophy

Out of the twenty-four clubs from the Northern Premier League, three teams reached for the fourth round:

Fourth Round

Semi-finals

Final

End of the season
At the end of the eighth season of the Northern Premier League none of the teams put forward for election received enough votes to be promoted to the Football League. Skelmersdale United resigned and Fleetwood folded.

Football League elections
Alongside the four Football League teams facing re-election, a total of nine non-League teams applied for election, three of which were from the Northern Premier League.  All four Football League teams were re-elected.

Promotion and relegation
The number of clubs reduced from twenty-four clubs to twenty-three clubs for the following season.

The following two clubs left the League at the end of the season:
Skelmersdale United resigned, demoted to Lancashire Combination
Fleetwood folded

The following club joined the League the following season:
Frickley Athletic promoted from Midland League (1889)

References

External links
 Northern Premier League official website
 Northern Premier League tables at RSSSF
 Football Club History Database

Northern Premier League seasons
5